Hyacinthella is a  genus of bulbous flowering plants in the family Asparagaceae, subfamily Scilloideae (formerly the family Hyacinthaceae). It is native to eastern and south-eastern Europe through to northern Iran, reaching as far south as Palestine. Turkey is the main country in which species are found.

Description

Hyacinthella species grow from bulbs whose tunics often bear powdery white crystals. There are usually two or three basal leaves with prominent strands of fibre. The inflorescences consist of short spikes (racemes) of tubular flowers, each with six short lobes, in colours ranging from pale blue to deep violet. They grow in rocky habitats, such as hillsides, which are hot and dry in the summer.

Species
, the World Checklist of Selected Plant Families accepted 17 species:

 Hyacinthella acutiloba K.Perss. & Wendelbo - Turkey
 Hyacinthella atropatana (Grossh.) Mordak & Zakhar. - Transcaucasus
 Hyacinthella campanulata K.Perss. & Wendelbo - Turkey
 Hyacinthella dalmatica Chouard - Croatia
 Hyacinthella glabrescens (Boiss.) K.Perss. & Wendelbo - Turkey
 Hyacinthella heldreichii (Boiss.) Chouard - Turkey
 Hyacinthella hispida (J.Gay) Chouard - Turkey
 Hyacinthella lazulina K.Perss.& Jim.Perss. - Turkey
 Hyacinthella leucophaea (K.Koch) Schur - Balkans, Russia, Ukraine
 Hyacinthella lineata (Steud. ex Schult. & Schult.f.) Chouard - Turkey
 Hyacinthella micrantha (Boiss.) Chouard - Turkey
 Hyacinthella millingenii (Post) Feinbrun - Turkey, Cyprus
 Hyacinthella nervosa (Bertol.) Chouard - Turkey, Syria, Lebanon, Palestine, Israel, Jordan
 Hyacinthella pallasiana (Steven) Losinsk. - Russia, Ukraine
 Hyacinthella persica (Boiss. & Buhse) Chouard - Iran
 Hyacinthella siirtensis B.Mathew - Turkey
 Hyacinthella venusta K.Perss. - Turkey

Cultivation

Some species are in cultivation, where they require a dry summer rest and are not suitable for growing in the open garden in areas with cooler, wetter summers.

References

Asparagaceae genera
Scilloideae